Emily Mallory Procter (born October 8, 1968) is an American actress and activist. She played Ainsley Hayes in the NBC political drama The West Wing (2000–2002; 2006) and Det. Calleigh Duquesne in the CBS police procedural drama CSI: Miami (2002–2012).

Early life
Procter was born on October 8, 1968. She was adopted as an infant by William Procter, a general practitioner, and Barbara Jones, a volunteer worker, and raised in Raleigh, North Carolina. She was three years old when her parents divorced. She has an older brother, Whit, who is also adopted.

Procter attended Ravenscroft School in Raleigh. While at East Carolina University, she became a member of Alpha Delta Pi sorority and worked as a television weather anchor at WNCT-TV in Greenville, North Carolina, eventually graduating with degrees in journalism and dance.

Career
After Procter moved to Los Angeles, her father paid for her to attend acting school for two years. Before even graduating, she had already landed a number of small film roles, including Cameron Crowe's sports romantic comedy-drama Jerry Maguire (1996), and as a co-star with David Schwimmer and Chris Cooper in the TV movie Breast Men (1997). In 1996, Procter guest-starred as Lana Lang in the ABC superhero drama Lois & Clark: The New Adventures of Superman. She briefly appeared in the TV movie The Dukes of Hazzard: Reunion! (1997) as Mavis and the drama Body Shots (1999) as Whitney Bryant.

In 1995, Procter played Annabel, a brief love interest of Joey Tribbiani (Matt LeBlanc), in the second episode of season two of the NBC sitcom Friends,  titled "The One with the Breast Milk." From 2000 to 2002 and again in 2006, Procter played the recurring role of Associate White House Counsel Ainsley Hayes in the NBC political drama The West Wing.

Procter is friends with actress Jorja Fox, who starred as Sara Sidle in the CBS police drama CSI: Crime Scene Investigation from 2000 to 2015. Fox persuaded Procter to audition for the starring role of Calleigh Duquesne in the CSI spin-off CSI: Miami, which she ended up winning. The show ran on CBS for 10 seasons, from September 23, 2002, to April 8, 2012.

Procter participated in 2007's Live Earth event by reading aloud, along with a number of other actresses, an essay that Michelle Gardner-Quinn wrote while she was a student at the University of Vermont.

In February 2013, Procter had a recurring role in the final two episodes of season four of the USA Network crime drama White Collar. She played Amanda Callaway, an agent from Atlanta who is promoted to head of the FBI's white collar crimes division in New York City.

Activism 
In 2019, Procter founded a nonprofit organization called Ground Breakers that supports change, community and equitable infrastructure. Her nonprofit The Ground offers social and emotional language awareness to combat negative personal narratives and promote peaceful conflict resolution. The Ground teams up Defy Ventures, a nonprofit that addresses social problems such as mass incarceration and recidivism, to offer programs at Kern Valley State Prison and Nightingale school in Stockton, California.

Personal life
Procter has been in a relationship with musician Paul Bryan since 2008. On December 8, 2010, she gave birth to their daughter Philippa Frances (called "Pippa"). Because her pregnancy was not written into the ninth season of CSI: Miami, her appearances were limited.

Procter has taken part in various triathlons and marathons. She is an avid poker player and has participated in at least one celebrity poker tournament. Procter also sings in a 1980s cover band originally called White Lightning but since renamed Motion. Procter has volunteered with the Young Storytellers Program and at homeless shelters.

Procter has an interest in interior decoration and antiques that she put to practical use when decorating the 1921 Spanish-style home that she owns in Los Angeles. During the 2007–08 Writers Guild strike, she designed a home for a friend in Saint John, U.S. Virgin Islands and, according to People magazine's Country Special of March 2009, decorated Kenny Chesney's home in Malibu. She was also a guest judge on the Home & Garden Television show Summer Showdown.
Procter was keynote speaker at the Spring 2019 commencement at her alma mater, East Carolina University.

Filmography

Film

Television

References

External links

 
 

1968 births
20th-century American actresses
21st-century American actresses
Actresses from North Carolina
American film actresses
American television actresses
East Carolina University alumni
Ravenscroft School alumni
Living people
Actors from Raleigh, North Carolina
American adoptees